, the anime adaptation of the Japanese superhero Kikaider, was produced by Sony Pictures Entertainment Visual Works (now Aniplex) and Ishimori Entertainment, and animated by Radix (later Radix Ace) and Studio OX. The series was broadcast on Kids Station from October 16, 2000, to January 8, 2001, with a total of 13 episodes. The anime followed more of the manga, with a darker nature of Jiro's reason to exist.

It was followed by the OVA 4-episode sequel called. .

An OVA special came with the Kikaider 01 DVD called  which teamed Kikaider with Inazuman, another superhero created by Shotaro Ishinomori. It was based on the manga chapter of Inazuman called .

An English dubbed version of the anime and OVA aired on Cartoon Network's Adult Swim programming block in the United States, with the exception of episode 8, which was a recap episode. The final OVA special (Kikaider vs. Inazuman) was never dubbed or released outside of Japan.

Plot

Android Kikaider
Dr. Kohmyoji creates Jiro (Kikaider) but an explosion occurs. When Dr Kohmyoji's kids, Mitsuko and Masaru, their father was nowhere to be found, Jiro wandering aimlessly in a remote area eventually meets Mitsuko. Mitsuko teaches Jiro to go into his robot form and about the GEMINI system inside him. The two grow closer together but the relationship development halts when a mysterious flute playing causes Jiro to attack Mitsuko, which causes her to believe he is a mad machine. Jiro inevitably leaves Mitsuko and Masaru in fear of being destroyed. Mitsuko then hires Hanpei Hattori and his apprentice Etsuko Sarutobi to find Jiro and bring him home. Throughout the story, Jiro encounters robots and learns more about Professor Gill and the evil organization DARK. A reoccurring android named Hakaider causes Jiro out of control by whistling (similar to Gill's flute). The more Mitsuko encounters Jiro the more she falls in love with him. When Mitsuko and Jiro reunite, they search for Mistuko's mother who is revealed to be in love with Professor Gill but could not bare the pain of being away from her children and gives them the location to Professor Gill's headquarters right before she killed herself. After they discover the location, Jiro attempts to fight Hakaider alone and also discovers the brain inside Hakaider's head is that of Dr. Kohmyoji's. Dr. Kohmyoji overtakes Hakaider's body before Hakaider could destroy it and infiltrates the headquarters. Once Professor Gill discovers Dr. Kohmyoji is in control he sends his robots to attack them. Jiro was able to give the brain to Hanpei in order to put it back into Dr. Kohmyoji's body. Professor Gill attempts to control Jiro with his flute, but Jiro to is able to overcome it. Hakaider then attempts to kill Professor Gill for betraying him and destroys the place along with Gill. Hanpei, Mitsuko and Etsuko able to escape, but didn't see Jiro escape with them. In the end, Mitsuko has hope that Jiro will return to them.

Kikaider 01
These four OVAs directly follow the conclusion of the 13 episode TV series. Jiro is now battling to save Akira, the son of Professor Gill who survived and transplanted his brain into Hakaider. Gill-Hakaider, supported by the Hakaider Squad and later SHADOW, targets Akira to power his giant-robot Armageddon Lord. Jiro meets his two "older" brothers Ichiro (Kikaider 01) and Rei (Kikaider 00), who lack Jiro's GEMINI system, and are joined by a SHADOW gynoid Bjinder.
In the end, Gill successfully captures Akira, and uses the Armageddon Lord to devastate the city from the previous series. Gill plants a submission chip inside Jiro and his android allies. But it unexpectedly subdues Jiro's GEMINI circuit rather than enslave him, making Jiro more human as he ends up destroying his brothers and kills Gill as the Armageddon Lord's generator explodes. Jiro leaves Akira in the hands of a monk scientist that raised Ichiro and reactivated Rei. Afterwards, Jiro then proclaims that having now committed such horrible acts that he is now human and that his heart will forever be in "eternal conflict" as he walks alone into the sunset.

The Boy Who Carried a Guitar: Kikaider vs. Inazuman
Set sometime after Kikaider 01, the cast of the Inazuman manga have a run-in with Jiro after one of their psychic adversaries possesses him in an attempt to murder Saburo, the protagonist of the Inazuman story. As the fight spirals out of control, Jiro's fight for inner peace comes to a head via Saburo's telepathy. The climax of the battle results in Jiro's definitive answers to the questions posed by his autonomy.

Cast

Japanese Cast
 Jiro/Kikaider: Tomokazu Seki
 Ichiro/Kikaider-01: Shotaro Morikubo
 Rei/Kikaider-00: Kazuhiko Inoue
 Mieko/Bijinder: Mitsuko Horie
 Mitsuko Kohmyoji: Yui Horie
 Masaru Kohmyoji: Yumiko Kobayashi
 Dr. Den Kohmyoji: Shōzō Iizuka
 Etsuko Sarutobi: Etsuko Kozakura
 Rieko: Sayaka Ohara
 Futen: Ichirō Nagai
 Akira: Madoka Akita
 Saburo/Hakaider: Juurouta Kosugi
 Chigusa Sakamoto: Minami Takayama
 Prof. Gill/Gill Hakaider: Shinji Ogawa
 Green Mantis: Masahiro Ogata
 Carmine Spider: Masashi Hirose
 Orange Ant: Jin Yamanoi:
 Yellow Jaguar Nobuyuki Hiyama
 Golden Bat: Norio Wakamoto
 Kuya & Kaito: Hisayoshi Suganuma
 Red Hakaider: Hidenari Ugaki
 Silver Hakaider: Kouichi Toochika
 Blue Hakaider: Takuma Suzuki
 Shadow Knight: Takeshi Watabe
 Saburo Kazeda/Inazuman: Kappei Yamaguchi
 Myoppe: Sayuri Yoshida

English Cast 
 Jiro/Kikaider: Dave Wittenberg
 Ichiro/Kikaider-01: Derek Stephen Prince
 Rei/Kikaider 00: Crispin Freeman
 Mieko/Bijinder: Wendee Lee
 Mitsuko Kohmyoji: Lia Sargent
 Masaru Kohmyoji: Barbara Goodson
 Dr. Den Kohmyoji: Christopher Carrol
 Hattori Hanpei: Kirk Thornton
 Etsuko Sarutobi: Melissa Fahn
 Rieko: Peggy O'Neal
 Futen: Simon Prescott
 Akira: Brianne Siddall
 Saburo/Hakaider: Steven Blum
 Chigusa Sakamoto: Carolyn Hennesy
 Prof. Gill/Gill Hakaider: Michael Gregory
 Carmine Spider: Lex Lang
 Orange Ant: Peter Lurie
 Yellow Jaguar, Shadow Knight: Bob Papenbrook
 Golden Bat: Michael McConnohie
 Kuya & Kaito: Anthony Pulcini
 Red Hakaider: Skip Stellrecht
 Silver Hakaider: Eddie Frierson
 Blue Hakaider: Steve McGowan
 Zaddam: Peter Spellos

Episodes

Android Kikaider: The Animation
English airdates are from its first English dub broadcast on Adult Swim in the United States.

Kikaider 01: The Animation

Media

Soundtrack

A soundtrack for the first animated series of Kikaider called  was released on December 6, 2000. It was composed by Akira Mitake and distributed by SME Visual Works.

Another Soundtrack called  was released on March 6, 2003. Music was composed by Kaworu Wada and distributed by SME Visual Works.

Reception
On Anime News Network, Zac Bertschy gave the first DVD an overall grade of B.

References

External links

TVTome show details
http://www.sonymusic.co.jp/Animation/Kikaider/

2000 anime television series debuts
2003 anime OVAs
Aniplex
Shotaro Ishinomori